Parliamentary elections were held in Norway in 1876. As political parties were not officially established until 1884, all those elected were independents. Voter turnout was 43.1, although only 4.6% of the country's population was eligible to vote.

Results

References

General elections in Norway
19th-century elections in Norway
Norway
Parliamentary